George W. Little was an American politician from New York.

Life
He lived in Otsego County, New York.

In February 1842, he was elected by the New York State Legislature a Canal Commissioner, and was in office until February 3, 1845. Afterwards he was Deputy State Treasurer.

Sources
The New York Civil List compiled by Franklin Benjamin Hough (page 42; Weed, Parsons and Co., 1858)
Political History of the State of New York from January 1, 1841, to January 1, 1847, Vol III, including the Life of Silas Wright by Jabez Delano Hammond (Hall & Dickson, Syracuse NY, 1848) Google Books, page 525
The American Almanac and Repository of Useful Knowledge by Jared Sparks, Francis Bowen & George Partridge Sanger (Gray and Bowen, 1847; page 245)

Year of birth missing
Year of death missing
People from Otsego County, New York
Erie Canal Commissioners